Chiropsalmus is a genus of box jellyfish in the family Chiropsalmidae.

Species
The following species are recognized in the genus Chiropsalmus:

Chiropsalmus alipes Gershwin, 2006
Chiropsalmus quadrumanus (F. Muller, 1859)

References

Chiropsalmidae
Medusozoa genera